Zhou Tiehai (born 1966) is a contemporary Chinese artist. Trained as a painter in his native Shanghai, Zhou co-founded Shanghai's first international art fair, SH Contemporary, in 2007, assumed the directorship of the Minsheng Art Museum in 2010, and founded West Bund Art & Design in 2014.

Artistic career

Zhou's art work often attempts to satirize much of modern Chinese art. He does not paint his own works, though he earned a M.F.A. from the School of Fine Arts at Shanghai University in 1989. He was quick to perceive the subtle colonialism that undergirded the Chinese art world of the early 1990s.

Zhou takes on the role of both artist and patron, as many of his airbrush paintings are rendered by assistants under his supervision. A typical process for Zhou Tiehai is to conceptualize a work, realize it on the computer, then rely upon the help of assistants to physically create it. He is mostly known for appropriating the Camel advertising character that he calls Joe Camel (playing on his family name "Zhou") and making large paintings that reference famous western motifs from art history.

Even though Zhou's work is exhibited widely in China and abroad, he does not produce any new work.

Museum Director

In 2009, Zhou was appointed Director of the Minsheng Art Museum in Shanghai.

West Bund Art & Design

In 2014, Zhou founded West Bund Art & Design and serve as Artistic Director. For Zhou, the continuously uncertain and evolving status of art in Shanghai—conveyed by the provisional material nature of this collage—is rich with possibility.

External links
Zhou Tiehai at 88MoCCA - The Museum of Chinese contemporary art on the web
 Homepage
 http://www.shanghart.com/artists/zhoutiehai/ex.htm
 Official website

References

Living people
1966 births
Artists from Shanghai